Jack Leslie is the name of:

Jack Leslie (English footballer) (1901–1988), football player for Plymouth Argyle F.C.
Jack Leslie (Australian footballer) (born 1995), plays for Gold Coast
Jack Leslie (politician) (1920–2010), Canadian politician and businessman
Sir John Leslie, 4th Baronet (1916–2016)
Jack Leslie (public relations executive), American public relations executive

See also
John Leslie (disambiguation)